The Flight Design Boxtair is a German single-place paraglider that was designed by Michaël Hartmann and Stefan Müller and produced by Flight Design of Landsberied. It is now out of production.

Design and development
The Boxtair was designed as a beginner glider. Test flying was carried out by factory test pilot Richard Bergmann. The models are each named for their approximate wing area in square metres/relative size.

Variants
Boxtair S
Small-sized model for lighter pilots. The glider model is DHV 1 certified.
Boxtair M
Mid-sized model for medium-weight pilots. Its  span wing has 44 cells and the aspect ratio is 5.1:1. The glider model is DHV 1 certified.
Boxtair L
Large-sized model for heavier pilots. The glider model is DHV 1 certified.

Specifications (Boxtair L)

References

Boxtair
Paragliders